The Winona Daily News is a daily newspaper serving Winona, Minnesota and the surrounding area. Founded in 1855, it is the second oldest continually running newspaper in the state.

The Daily News was known as the Republican Herald until 1954. It shares some of the same production staff and pressing facilities as La Crosse Tribune since 1999; the presses are located in Madison, Wisconsin.

Owned by Lee Enterprises, the newspaper is the primary media outlet for the area.

References

See also
List of newspapers in Minnesota

Newspapers established in 1855
Newspapers published in Minnesota
Winona County, Minnesota
Lee Enterprises publications
Winona, Minnesota
1855 establishments in Minnesota Territory